Thomas Goldstein may refer to:

 Thomas Goldstein (historian) (1913–1997), German-born United States historian
 Tom Goldstein, American attorney